Kala Gujran railway station (Urdu and ) is located in Kala Gujran village, Jhelum district of Punjab province, Pakistan.

See also
 List of railway stations in Pakistan
 Pakistan Railways

References

External links

Railway stations in Jhelum District
Railway stations on Karachi–Peshawar Line (ML 1)